Galaxy Racer is an esports and gaming organization based in Dubai, UAE and founded in 2019 by Paul Roy. As of 2023, Galaxy Racer's competitive esports division, Nigma Galaxy, has a roster of 13 esports teams playing Battlegrounds Mobile India, Counter-Strike: Global Offensive, Dota 2, Fortnite, Free Fire, League of Legends, League of Legends: Wild Rift, Mobile Legends: Bang Bang and PUBG Mobile. It also has partnerships with various companies and organizations such as La Liga and Polaris Sports.

History
In 2019, Galaxy Racer Esports together with its partners formed the first female esports team in the Middle East. The team consisted of five members: Madha Naz, Arwa Hameed, Reem Faisal, Fatima Said and Amna Raad Alameri.

On 12-13 December 2019, Galaxy Racer and Meydan One organized the first interschool esports tournament in the Middle East featuring FIFA 20. The tournament was part of the 2019 GIRLGAMER Esports Festival. On 19-22 February 2020, Galaxy Racer organized the final of the GIRLGAMER Esports Festival, where gamers competed in Counter Strike: Global Offensive and League of Legends. The event was held at the Meydan Grandstand in Dubai.

In 2021, Team Galaxy Racer won the Free Fire India Championship (FFIC). Team Galaxy Racer captained by VasiyoCRJ, Golden, BarcaBoi, Aman and MaryX scored 70 points ahead of Team Chaos (68 points) and Team Elite (67 points), who came in as first and second runners-up, respectively. Galaxy Racer received a prize pool of Rs 35,000,000. In addition to the prize money, the Galaxy Racer team got the opportunity to qualify for the Free Fire World Series tournament in Singapore.

From 18 April to 21 April 2021 Galaxy Racer organized Fortnite tournament in Australia. In July 2021, Allan Fang was appointed as the organization's new chief marketing officer (CMO).

In the same month, Galaxy Racer won the Valorant Champions Tour (VCT) Challengers 2 Stage 3 for the Philippines.
Galaxy Racer were directly selected for the VCT Challengers tournament for the Philippines after losing to Bren Esports in the Challengers 1 Grand Finals in early July 2021. Galaxy Racer won against Sierra Esports Atlas and Alpha Esports Pro to advance to the VCT Challengers Grand Finals. In the grand final with a score of 3:1, they defeated the SV Empire team, which in turn defeated UCFC Esports and Oasis Gaming. Galaxy Racer received a prize of 100,000 pesos and a spot in the 2021 VCT Stage 3 Challengers Playoffs for South East Asia.

From 1 to 4 August 2021, Galaxy Racer partnered with football player Pierre-Emerick Aubameyang and his brother William-Fils to host an interregional Fortnite: Battle Royale tournament for Europe and the Middle East called The Aubameyang Cup.

At the beginning of August 2021, the PUBG Mobile and Battlegrounds Mobile India roster for Galaxy Racer was changed. The team for PUBG Mobile included Raouf Abdellah, Maad Ali Akshar, Reshar Dawid, Muslim Ahmed Jawad and Mohammed Qasim, while the Battlegrounds Mobile India team consisted of Mohammed Owais Lakhani, Aakash Anandani, Hemanth Sethi, Harshit Mahajan and Yogesh Yadav.

On 15 August 2021, the Galaxy Racer team from Southeast Asia became the BTS Pro Series: SEA Season 7 champion by defeating Fnatic in the grand final. Galaxy Racer received a $18,000 prize plus an additional $2,000 for their group stage victories.

In September 2021, Team Nigma and Galaxy Racer merged under the name Nigma Galaxy.

Galaxy Racer along with eLaLiga Santander organized the Beat the Best international tournaments series for FIFA 22 and FIFA Online 4 players from December 2021 to May 2022. From 2 to 6 March 2022, Galaxy Racer hosted the GAMERS GALAXY: Dota 2 Invitational Series in Dubai. In the first round, the Nigma Galaxy team played against Tundra Esports and, in the final gaming result, the Boom Esports team won the tournament.

In the spring of 2022, Galaxy Racer established HER Galaxy, a platform for female-identifying gamers, headquartered in Los Angeles. In the summer of 2022, Galaxy Racer launched Pakistan's first esports league, the Supreme Galactic League, which took place from August to October 2022.

As of 2023, the esports organization has its representatives in the UAE, Indonesia, India, Malaysia, Pakistan, the Philippines, Thailand, United States and other locations.

Rosters

BGMI

CS:GO

Dota 2

Forntine

Free Fire

India team

Thailand team

League of Legends

League of Legends: Wild Rift

Mobile Legends: Bang Bang

PUBG Mobile

Valorant

Partnerships and collaborations
In 2023, Galaxy Racer announced its partnership with Polaris Sports, an organization dedicated to protecting the commercial rights of athletes. As part of the partnership, Polaris Sports becomes an investor and shareholder in Galaxy Racer. In December 2022, Galaxy Racer signed a 15-year partnership with Spanish La Liga to work on the sports media scene.

In May 2022, Galaxy Racer partnered with the Collegiate Center for Esports (CCE) to create first esports tournament in the Philippines. In August 2022, they partnered with Empire Records to form the music label GXR Records.

In January 2021, Galaxy Racer announced its partnership with eLaliga. In February 2021, Galaxy Racer acquired a majority stake in Philippine esports and gaming agency DreamFyre. In May 2021, they have entered a partnership with gaming company Techxhub for its PUBG Mobile players.

See also
 FaZe Clan
 100 Thieves

References

Notes

Citations

External links
 Official website

Organisations based in the United Arab Emirates
2019 establishments in the United Arab Emirates
Esports teams established in 2019